Clay is a census-designated place in Sacramento County, California. The 2010 United States census reported Clay's population was 1,195.

Geography
According to the United States Census Bureau, the CDP covers an area of 6.8 square miles (17.5 km2), all of it land.

Demographics

The 2010 United States Census reported that Clay had a population of 1,195. The racial makeup of Clay was 981 (82.1%) White, 6 (0.5%) African American, 24 (2.0%) Native American, 8 (0.7%) Asian, 0 (0.0%) Pacific Islander, 108 (9.0%) from other races, and 68 (5.7%) from two or more races. Hispanic or Latino of any race were 242 persons (20.3%).

The Census reported that 1,195 people (100% of the population) lived in households, 0 (0%) lived in non-institutionalized group quarters, and 0 (0%) were institutionalized.

There were 402 households, out of which 141 (35.1%) had children under the age of 18 living in them, 261 (64.9%) were opposite-sex married couples living together, 31 (7.7%) had a female householder with no husband present, 15 (3.7%) had a male householder with no wife present.  There were 18 (4.5%) unmarried opposite-sex partnerships, and 5 (1.2%) same-sex married couples or partnerships. 77 households (19.2%) were made up of individuals, and 28 (7.0%) had someone living alone who was 65 years of age or older. The average household size was 2.97.  There were 307 families (76.4% of all households); the average family size was 3.39.

The population was spread out, with 294 people (24.6%) under the age of 18, 118 people (9.9%) aged 18 to 24, 215 people (18.0%) aged 25 to 44, 416 people (34.8%) aged 45 to 64, and 152 people (12.7%) who were 65 years of age or older.  The median age was 43.5 years. For every 100 females, there were 95.9 males.  For every 100 females age 18 and over, there were 95.0 males.

The homeowner vacancy rate was 1.1%; the rental vacancy rate was 3.3%.  1,028 people (86.0% of the population) lived in owner-occupied housing units and 167 people (14.0%) lived in rental housing units.

References

Census-designated places in Sacramento County, California
Census-designated places in California